Death Rituals is the eighth studio album by American death metal band Six Feet Under. It was released on November 11, 2008, through Metal Blade Records. It is also available in a limited digipak edition with three live bonus tracks.

On October 6, 2008, the song "Shot in the Head" was posted at Brave Words & Bloody Knuckles as part of their "Knuckle Tracks" online player. The song was removed on October 12, 2008.

Another song titled "Seed Of Filth" was available for streaming on the Metal Blade Records MySpace page from October 21, 2008. The song was also released as the album's first single. A video was shot on October 31, 2008, at Gasoline Alley in Largo, Florida.

This was the last album of original material to feature founding bassist Terry Butler and drummer Greg Gall. It is also their longest album to date, clocking in at just under 50 minutes.

Recording and production 
The recording process of the album began in May 2008 at the Morrisound Studios in Tampa, Florida with Chris Carroll.

The album has so far proved slightly more popular amongst fans than Commandment. Kerrang also gave the album a rare '5K' rating.

Track listing

Personnel 
Six Feet Under
Chris Barnes – vocals
Steve Swanson – guitars
Terry Butler – bass
Greg Gall – drums
Session musician
Iggy Pop – voice message on "Shot in the Head"
Production
Produced by Chris Barnes
Mixed by Chris Carroll, Toby Wright, James Musshorn and Ian Blanch
Tracked drums by Bill Metoyer
Engineered by Alex Graupera, Sean Burnett and Jason Blackerby
Mastered by Alan Douches
Artwork
Graphic design, cover artwork and layout by Meran Karanitant
Photography by Christian Girstmair

References 

2008 albums
Six Feet Under (band) albums
Metal Blade Records albums
Albums recorded at Morrisound Recording